Linehaul is a 1973 Australian television film about truckie Dave Morgan. It was a pilot for a series that was never made and an early vehicle for Jack Thompson.

Cast
Jack Thompson as Dave Morgan
Peter Gwynne
Keith Lee sa John Macleod
Alfred Sandor as Philip Mather
Bunny Gibson

Reception
The Sydney Morning Herald wrote that "it's probably one of the best written, acted and directed pieces of TV drama to hit the screen this year. The dialogue was taut and economical. The acting, particularly that of Jack Thompson... was first class."

References

External links
Linehaul at IMDb

Australian television films
Films directed by Frank Arnold